Where the Heart Is is a 1990 American romantic comedy film co-written and directed by John Boorman and starring Dabney Coleman, Uma Thurman, Joanna Cassidy, Crispin Glover, Suzy Amis, and Christopher Plummer.

Plot
Stewart McBain is a successful self-made demolitions expert who blows up buildings for a living. In the midst of one such project, a group of protesters stops the last building on a lot, the Dutch House, from being demolished. When McBain appears on TV to dismiss the protests, he is made to look foolish. Returning home, his three college-aged children–Daphne, Chloe, and Jimmy–ridicule him for his television appearance.

Feeling his children are spoiled, McBain kicks them out of the house. Giving them each $750, he drops them off at the Dutch House, which is dilapidated and on the verge of collapse. Jean, their mother, tries to stop him but in vain.

In order to finance their new lives, the children take on housemates. These include a fashion designer named Lionel; a homeless magician, Shitty; a stockbroker, Tom; and Sheryl, an amateur occultist. Chloe is commissioned to finish a calendar for an insurance company. Lionel has to complete his designs for a fashion show. Chloe uses her roommates to model in the calendar, incorporating their bodies into ethereal murals on their walls, and Lionel ends up using some of them for his show.

A stockmarket crash where Tom is chiefly responsible for Mr McBain's stock plummeting, 
brings McBain to ruin. Desperately attempting to stave off a hostile takeover of his demolition company, he fails. Jean shows up at the Dutch House hysterical as he loses their home and they become destitute. 

Mr McBain disappears into the city, feeling down and out. Sleeping in the homeless cardboard box shanty town, scavenging the next day in the dump. Ultimately, his children take him in after Sheryl finds him, and he starts to see the world in a new light. 

Evicted from Dutch House after they've all helped Lionel with his dresses and Chloe with her calendar, the homeless shelter turns the McBains and friends away. Jimmy has an epiphany, as there is a bad thunderstorm and the Dutch House is structurally unsound, to use his father's demolishion skills. 

The family recovers their properties and wealth, and have learned how to live more simply.

Cast

 Dabney Coleman as Stewart McBain
 Joanna Cassidy as Jean McBain
 Suzy Amis as Chloe McBain
 Uma Thurman as Daphne McBain
 David Hewlett as Jimmy McBain
 Crispin Glover as Lionel
 Christopher Plummer as "Shitty"
 Maury Chaykin as Harry
 Dylan Walsh as Tom
 Sheila Kelley as Sheryl
 Ken Pogue as Hamilton

Reception
Where the Heart Is was poorly received by critics. On Rotten Tomatoes, the film holds a rating of 9% from 11 reviews.

References

External links

 
 
 

1990 films
1990 romantic comedy films
American romantic comedy films
1990s English-language films
Films directed by John Boorman
Touchstone Pictures films
1990s American films